is the 18th single from Japanese idol group Idoling!!!. It reached number 4 on the Oricon weekly chart and number 5 on Music Station Power Ranking. It is the first single to feature Idoling!!! 5th generation members who joined in April 2012.

Contents 
One Up!!!/Ichigo Gyūnyū released in three types:
 Limited A-type (CD and DVD)
 Limited B-type (CD and Blu-ray)
 Normal Type (CD only)

Track listing

CD

DVD 
 One Up!!! -Music Video-
 One Up!!! -Dancing Ver.-
 Making of One Up!!! MV

Blu-ray 
 One Up!!! -Music Video-
 One Up!!! -Dancing Ver.-
 Making of One Up!!! MV
 Ichigo Gyūnyū -Music Video-
 Ichigo Gyūnyū -Solo Shot Ver.-
 Making of Ichigo Gyūnyū MV

Notes 
 Limited Edition Type A CD cover features 11 members: Mai Endo, Erica Tonooka, Rurika Yokoyama, Serina Nagano, Hitomi Sakai, Ami Kikuchi, Hitomi Miyake, Manami Nomoto, Kurumi Takahashi, Karen Ishida, and Reia Kiyoku.
 Limited Edition Type B CD cover features 10 members: Yui Kawamura, Nao Asahi, Yurika Tachibana, Ai Ōkawa, Kaede Hashimoto, Ruka Kurata, Yūna Itō, Kaoru Gotō, Chika Ojima, and Ramu Tamagawa.
 Megami no Pulse only available on Limited Edition Type A. Used as a CM song for Marudai Shokuhin Ganbare! Nippon! Campaign!
 Sayonara Junjyō only available on Limited Edition Type B. Features Serina Nagano, Ami Kikuchi, Yurika Tachibana, and Ai Ōkawa as main vocals.

References

External links 
 Idoling!!! official site - Fuji TV
 Idoling!!! official site - Pony Canyon
 Marudai Shokuhin official site

2012 singles
Idoling!!! songs
Pony Canyon singles
2012 songs